Reformation Parliament may refer to:
 English Reformation Parliament of 1529-1536
 Scottish Reformation Parliament, commencing 1560